Dhanraj Singh is an Indian cricketer. He has played 51 First class and 32 List A matches. He was the top wicket-taker in the first edition (1993–94) of the Vijay Hazare Trophy representing Haryana cricket team.

References

External links 
Dhanraj Singh at ESPNcricinfo

Indian cricketers
Living people
1968 births
Haryana cricketers
People from Faridabad